Robert Elmer "Bob" Netzley (December 7, 1922 – July 28, 2010) was Ohio's 2nd  longest tenured legislator, serving in the Ohio House of Representatives for forty years, retiring in 2000 when he was term-limited.  His district consisted of a portion of Miami County, Ohio.  He was succeeded by Diana Fessler. Netzley was a graduate of Miami University where he was initiated as a member of Phi Kappa Tau.

The portion of State Route 571 within Miami County is designated "Robert E. Netzley Highway" in his honor.

References

External links
https://web.archive.org/web/20110721164855/http://www.dispatchpolitics.com/live/content/editorials/stories/2009/06/28/halcol28.ART_ART_06-28-09_G5_JKEA8EH.html?sid=101

1922 births
2010 deaths
Republican Party members of the Ohio House of Representatives
Miami University alumni